"I Lay My Love on You" is a song by Irish boy band Westlife. It was released as the fourth single from their second studio album, Coast to Coast (2000), in 2001 outside the United Kingdom and Ireland. A Spanish version of the song, "En ti deje mi amor", was also recorded and can be found on their South African-only release, Released. It is the band's 19th-most streamed song in the United Kingdom as of January 2019.

Background
"I Lay My Love on You", along with "When You're Looking Like That", were not released in the UK. In an interview with Westlife, Mark Feehily said that the main reason behind it was because they had not had as much exposure in Asia and Australia.

Music video
The music video features Westlife's activities in Asia, including South Korea, Japan, and Singapore. Many parts of the video was also shot in Singapore. It also features the band promoting their latest studio album at the time, Coast to Coast. The video also interspersed with the band singing.

Track listings
CD1
 "I Lay My Love on You" (Single Remix) – 3:29
 "Dreams Come True" – 3:07
 CD1 is cased within a digipak and comes with four limited edition photocards.

CD2
 "I Lay My Love on You" (Single Remix) – 3:29
 "Dreams Come True" – 3:07
 "My Love" – 3:52
 "Nothing Is Impossible" – 3:15

Credits and personnel
Recording
 Recorded at Cheiron Studios, Stockholm, Sweden
 Strings recorded at Roam Studios, Stockholm, Sweden

Personnel
 Per Magnusson – songwriter, producer, arranger, keyboards, programming
 David Kreuger – songwriter, producer, arranger, programming
 Jörgen Elofsson – songwriter
 Björn Norén – strings recording
 Bernard Löhr – mixing
 Esbjörn Öhrwall – acoustic, electric and slide guitars
 Tomas Lindberg – bass
 Gustave Lund – percussion
 Anders von Hofsten – additional backing vocals
 Björn Engelmann – mastering

Charts

Weekly charts

Year-end charts

Release history

References

External links
 Official Website

2000 songs
2001 singles
Music videos directed by Stuart Gosling
RCA Records singles
Songs written by David Kreuger
Songs written by Jörgen Elofsson
Songs written by Per Magnusson
Sony BMG singles
Sony Music singles
Westlife songs